Greimersburg is an Ortsgemeinde – a municipality belonging to a Verbandsgemeinde, a kind of collective municipality – in the Cochem-Zell district in Rhineland-Palatinate, Germany. It belongs to the Verbandsgemeinde of Cochem, whose seat is in the like-named town.

Geography 

The municipality lies in the Eifel between Trier and Koblenz near the towns of Cochem on the Moselle and Kaisersesch.

History 
In the 7th century, Greimersburg had its first documentary mention as one of Frankish ruler Pepin the Elder’s holdings. Electoral-Trier overlordship was swept away in 1794 by the French Revolutionary occupation. In 1815 Greimersburg was assigned to the Kingdom of Prussia at the Congress of Vienna. Since 1946, it has been part of the then newly founded state of Rhineland-Palatinate.

Religion 
Until 1728, Greimersburg was assigned to the Catholic parish of Klotten. Today it forms a parish together with Landkern.

Politics

Municipal council 
The council is made up of 12 council members, who were elected at the municipal election held on 7 June 2009, and the honorary mayor as chairman.

The municipal election held on 7 June 2009 yielded the following results:

Mayor 
Greimersburg’s mayor is Hans-Werner Junglas, elected in 2012. He succeeded Paul Lauxen who held this position since 2001.

Coat of arms 
The German blazon reads: In Silber, ein durchgehendes rotes Kreuz belegt mit einem schwarzen Schild, darin ein goldener Kreuzstab mit daran hängenden silbernen Glöckchen.

The municipality’s arms might in English heraldic language be described thus: Argent a cross gules surmounted by an inescutcheon sable charged with a cross tau Or, hanging from each of whose arms a bell of the first.

The arms were designed by A. Friderichs of Zell.

Culture and sightseeing

Buildings 
The following are listed buildings or sites in Rhineland-Palatinate’s Directory of Cultural Monuments:
 St. Antonius Abbas Catholic Chapel; aisleless church, 1777, expanded with a schoolhouse in 1867; basalt warriors’ memorial with relief
 Hauptstraße (no number): estate complex; timber-frame house, partly solid, 18th century, shed/stable
 Hauptstraße 36: timber-frame house, plastered and slated, 18th century (?)
 Landkerner Straße 2: barn with oven, 19th century
 On Landesstraße (State Road) 98, going towards Landkern: wayside chapel, from 1861
 North of Greimersburg: basalt wayside cross from 1776
 South of Greimersburg: basalt wayside cross from 1790
 Southwest of Greimersburg: basalt wayside cross; niche cross, 17th century (?)

Natural monuments 
 Tal der Wilden Endert (“Valley of the Wild Endert”) with its former mills.

References

External links 
Municipality’s official webpage 

Cochem-Zell